José van Veen (born 9 January 1986) is a Dutch rower who competes in the eights. She won a silver medal at the 2016 European Championships and placed sixth at the 2016 Rio Olympics.

References

External links

 

1986 births
Living people
Dutch female rowers
Olympic rowers of the Netherlands
Rowers at the 2016 Summer Olympics
Place of birth missing (living people)
European Rowing Championships medalists
The Hague University of Applied Sciences alumni
20th-century Dutch women
21st-century Dutch women